Phillip Francis Hawthorne (24 October 1943 – 18 September 1994) was an Australian rugby league and rugby union footballer – a dual-code international. He represented the Wallabies in twenty-one Tests and the Kangaroos in three Tests. He captained Australia in rugby league the 3rd Test of the 1970 Ashes series. His mother was killed in a car accident in Newcastle when he was 14.

Rugby union career
Hawthorne was born in 1943 in Newcastle, New South Wales. From the Wanderers Rugby Union Club in Newcastle, he first represented for the Wallabies age 18 as Fly-half. For the next five years he was a consistent selection for Wallaby Tests and tours and formed a formidable partnership with scrum-half Ken Catchpole.

On the 1966–67 Tour of England Hawthorne played in 5 Tests and set a new tour point scoring record of 26 points (6 field goals, 2 penalties and 2 conversions). In 1967 he joined Randwick to pair with Catchpole at club level and he played further Tests that year.

Rugby league career
In 1968 Hawthorne accepted a then record $30,000 contract to switch to the professional code and join the St. George Dragons. He played fifty-six games for the Dragons from 1968 to 1971 at Five-eighth before he joined Eastern Suburbs for his final season in 1972.

In 1969 he appeared as a guest player for Auckland in a match against the New Zealand national rugby league team to mark the New Zealand Rugby League's diamond jubilee.

Phil Hawthorne's international rugby league debut against Great Britain in Brisbane on 6 June 1970 alongside John Brass saw them together become Australia's 32nd and 33rd dual code rugby internationals. He played all three Tests against Great Britain in 1970 and was captain in the 3rd Test with Langlands and Sattler injured and unavailable. He is named on the Australian Players Register as Kangaroo No. 441.

Injury restricted Hawthorne's appearances in 1971. He left the club at the end of that year to join the Eastern Suburbs Roosters but spent much of the 1972 season in reserve grade behind the competition's eventual player of the year, his former Wallaby teammate John Ballesty.

He moved to Coffs Harbour in 1973 and captain-coached a local side. He was diagnosed with leukaemia in 1991, and died in September 1994, at the age of 50.

Notable statistics
Hawthorne is remembered as a field-goal specialist with notable statistics including:
 6 field goals in 5 Test matches on the 66-67 Wallaby Tour
 18 field goals in 18 appearances with St George in 1968
 12 field goals in 12 appearances with St George in 1969
 3 field goals in his 3 Rugby League Tests in 1970.

References

External links

1943 births
1994 deaths
Auckland rugby league team players
Australia international rugby union players
Australia national rugby league team captains
Australia national rugby league team players
Australian rugby league players
Australian rugby union players
Dual-code rugby internationals
People from the Hunter Region
Rugby league players from Newcastle, New South Wales
Rugby union players from Newcastle, New South Wales
Hawthorne,Phil
Sydney Roosters players
Rugby union fly-halves